Oreodytes is a genus of beetles in the family Dytiscidae, containing the following species:

 Oreodytes abbreviatus (Fall, 1923)
 Oreodytes alaskanus (Fall, 1926)
 Oreodytes alpinus (Paykull, 1798)
 Oreodytes angustior (Hatch, 1928)
 Oreodytes babai (Satô, 1990)
 Oreodytes congruus (LeConte, 1878)
 Oreodytes crassulus (Fall, 1923)
 Oreodytes dauricus (Motschulsky, 1860)
 Oreodytes davisii (Curtis, 1831)
 Oreodytes humboldtensis Zimmerman, 1985
 Oreodytes jakovlevi (Zaitzev, 1905)
 Oreodytes kanoi (Kamiya, 1938)
 Oreodytes laevis (Kirby, 1837)
 Oreodytes meridionalis Binaghi & Sanfilippo, 1971
 Oreodytes mongolicus (Brinck, 1943)
 Oreodytes natrix (Sharp, 1884)
 Oreodytes obesus (LeConte, 1866)
 Oreodytes okulovi Lafer, 1988
 Oreodytes picturatus (Horn, 1883)
 Oreodytes productotruncatus (Hatch, 1944)
 Oreodytes quadrimaculatus (Horn, 1883)
 Oreodytes rhyacophilus Zimmerman, 1985
 Oreodytes sanmarkii (C.R.Sahlberg, 1826)
 Oreodytes scitulus (LeConte, 1855)
 Oreodytes septentrionalis (Gyllenhal, 1826)
 Oreodytes shorti Shaverdo & Fery, 2006
 Oreodytes sierrae Zimmerman, 1985
 Oreodytes snoqualmie (Hatch, 1933)
 Oreodytes subrotundus (Fall, 1923)

References

Dytiscidae genera